The Pogostick is an unfinished 2003 comic book series written by Al Columbia and drawn by Ethan Persoff. The series is a black comedy about the day-to-day struggles of Audrey Grinfield, a mentally disturbed office worker at an industrial design firm. Two issues were published by Fantagraphics Books in February and December 2003 before Columbia abandoned the story. The Pogostick was well received by critics, with The Sunday Guardian calling the series "a compelling read, one that might even cause you to re-evaluate your priorities in life." It was nominated for a 2004 Harvey Award for Best New Series.

References

External links
 Ethan Persoff's website

Comics by Al Columbia
Fantagraphics titles
Horror comics
Black comedy comics
Unpublished comics